Dyakonovsky is a rural locality (a khutor) in Tishanskoye Rural Settlement, Nekhayevsky District, Volgograd Oblast, Russia. The population was four as of 2010.

Geography 
Klyuchansky is the nearest rural locality.

References 

Rural localities in Nekhayevsky District